Land of the Yankee Fork State Park is a history-oriented public recreation area covering  in Custer County, Idaho, United States. The state park interprets Idaho's frontier mining history, including the ghost towns Bayhorse, Bonanza, and Custer. The interpretive center near Challis has a museum and gold panning station. The park was created in 1990 with the purchase of twenty acres where the interpretive center is located two miles south of Challis. It is operated by the Idaho Department of Parks and Recreation in cooperation with the United States Forest Service.

See also

 List of Idaho state parks
 National Parks in Idaho

References

External links

Land of the Yankee Fork State Park Idaho Parks and Recreation
Land of the Yankee Fork State Park Mining District Map Idaho Parks and Recreation

State parks of Idaho
Protected areas established in 1990
Protected areas of Custer County, Idaho
1990 establishments in Idaho